The Öland class was a Swedish destroyer class. Originally four ships were planned for the class but after the end of World War II two were canceled. When commissioned the ships were the largest destroyers that had ever served in the Swedish navy. The ships served in the navy until 1979 when the last ship was decommissioned.

Design 
Because of their weight the destroyers were constructed with a double hull to withstand damages better. Some parts of the inner hull were made of armor to protect important parts like the engine room.

References

Sources

 
Destroyers of the Swedish Navy
Destroyer classes